Mid-term parliamentary elections were held in Costa Rica on 9 February 1930. The result was a victory for the National Union, which received 32.5% of the vote. Voter turnout was 30.7%.

Results

References

1930 elections in Central America
1930 in Costa Rica
Elections in Costa Rica